St Andrew's Hall and Blackfriars' Hall or The Halls are a Grade I listed complex of former friary church and convent buildings in the English city of Norwich, Norfolk, dating back to the 14th century.  They make up the most complete friary surviving in England. The complex is made up of several flint buildings. The centrepiece is St Andrew's Hall. The halls are now used for conferences, weddings, concerts, beer festivals and meetings. The maximum capacity is 1,200 people. It is one of the Norwich 12 heritage sites.

History
In the mid 13th century a religious order called the Friars of the Sack settled in Norwich, in the parishes of St Andrew and St Peter Hungate. By the early 14th century, the group was in decline. In 1307 the Dominican Order, also called the Black Friars because of the colour of their habit, took over the site by royal licence under the condition they cared for the last remaining friar.

The first church and buildings were destroyed in 1413 in a serious fire which destroyed a large part of the city. The second church building which survives today was completed in 1470. The nave of the new church now  forms St Andrew's Hall; the chancel (of five bays), Blackfriars’ Hall. There is also a crypt, chapel and cloisters.

During the Reformation, the site was saved by the City Corporation, which bought it from the king for use as a 'common hall.' Since then the complex has been used for worship, as a mint and as a workhouse.  It has been used regularly for civic occasions since 1544, when the first Mayor's feast was held for the inauguration of Henry Fuller. The Norwich Triennial Festival, the third oldest in the country, began here in 1824.

See also
 Grade I listed buildings in Norwich

References

External links

 Official website
 Norwich Blackfriars Online

Buildings and structures in Norwich
Monasteries in Norfolk
Norwich, St Andrew's Hall
Norwich